Stefan Popovski-Turanjanin (born 7 March 1993) is a Serbian affiliate manager and former professional basketball player.

External links
 
 Player Profile at proballers.com
 Player Profile at eurobasket.com
 Player Profile at realgm.com

1993 births
Living people
ABA League players
Basketball players at the 2010 Summer Youth Olympics
BC Oostende players
CAB Madeira players
KK Jagodina players
KK MZT Skopje players
KK Rabotnički players
Serbian expatriate basketball people in Belgium
Serbian expatriate basketball people in Portugal
Serbian expatriate basketball people in North Macedonia
Serbian men's basketball players
Serbian men's 3x3 basketball players
Serbs of North Macedonia
Small forwards
Youth Olympic gold medalists for Serbia